Juan Mathias Bogado Castro (born March 23, 1990 in Buenos Aires, Argentina) is an Argentine footballer, who currently plays for Juventud de Las Piedras.

Career 
Bogado started his career with CA Buenos Aires al Pacífico. His family settled 2003 to Uruguay and he started his career here with Nacional de Montevideo. He played for them two years, before signed in Winter 2006 for CA Bella Vista. Bogado played twelve months for Bella Vista and joined than in December 2007 to Montevideo Wanderers F.C. After four years in the youth of Montevideo Wanderers, was promoted to the senior team and played his debut with the Wanderers 2011 in the Uruguayan Primera División. Bogado played only three Uruguayan Primera División for Montevideo Wanderers games, before moved to Club Atlético Torque.

Teams

Youth 
 Club Nacional de Futbol (2004-2005)
 Bella Vista (2006)
 Montevideo Wanderers (2007–2012)

Senior 
 Montevideo Wanderers (2011–2012)
 Club Atlético Torque (2012-2013)
 Canadian Soccer Club (2013-now)

References

1990 births
Living people
Argentine footballers
Argentine expatriate footballers
Uruguayan Primera División players
Uruguayan Segunda División players
Categoría Primera A players
Montevideo Wanderers F.C. players
Montevideo City Torque players
Canadian Soccer Club players
Jaguares de Córdoba footballers
Oriental players
Juventud de Las Piedras players
Association football defenders
Argentine expatriate sportspeople in Uruguay
Argentine expatriate sportspeople in Colombia
Expatriate footballers in Uruguay
Expatriate footballers in Colombia
Footballers from Buenos Aires